Vǫluspá (also Völuspá, Vǫlospá or Vǫluspǫ́; Old Norse: 'Prophecy of the völva, a seeress') is the best known poem of the Poetic Edda. It tells the story of the creation of the world and its coming end and subsequent rebirth, related to the audience by a völva addressing Odin. It is one of the most important primary sources for the study of Norse mythology. The poem is preserved whole in the Codex Regius and Hauksbók manuscripts while parts of it are quoted in the Prose Edda.

Preservation
Völuspá is found in the Icelandic Codex Regius manuscript (ca. 1270) and in Haukr Erlendsson's Hauksbók Codex (ca. 1334), and many of its stanzas are quoted or paraphrased in the Prose Edda (composed ca. 1220, oldest extant manuscript dates from ca. 1300). The order and number of the stanzas varies in these sources. Some editors and translators have further rearranged the material. The Codex Regius version is usually taken as a base for editions.

Synopsis
The poem starts with the völva requesting silence from "the sons of Heimdallr" (human beings) and asking Odin whether he wants her to recite ancient lore. She says she remembers giants born in antiquity who reared her.

She then goes on to relate a creation myth and mentions Ymir; the world was empty until the sons of Burr lifted the earth out of the sea. The Æsir then established order in the cosmos by finding places for the sun, the moon and the stars, thereby starting the cycle of day and night. A golden age ensued where the Æsir had plenty of gold and happily constructed temples and made tools. But then three mighty giant maidens came from Jötunheimr and the golden age came to an end. The Æsir then created the dwarves, of whom Mótsognir and Durinn are the mightiest.

At this point ten of the poem's stanzas are over and six stanzas ensue which contain names of dwarves. This section, sometimes called "Dvergatal" ("Catalogue of Dwarves"), is usually considered an interpolation and sometimes omitted by editors and translators.

After the "Dvergatal", the creation of the first man and woman are recounted and Yggdrasil, the world-tree, is described. The seer recalls the burning of Gullveig that led to the first "folk" war, and what occurred in the struggle between the Æsir and Vanir. She then recalls the time Freyja was given to the giants, which is commonly interpreted as a reference to the myth of the giant builder, as told in Gylfaginning 42.

The seeress then reveals to Odin that she knows some of his own secrets, and that he sacrificed an eye in pursuit of knowledge. She tells him she knows where his eye is hidden and how he gave it up in exchange for knowledge. She asks him in several refrains if he understands, or if he would like to hear more.

In the Codex Regius version, the seeress goes on to describe the slaying of Baldr, best and fairest of the gods and the enmity of Loki, and of others. Then she prophesies the destruction of the gods where fire and flood overwhelm heaven and earth as the gods fight their final battles with their enemies. This is the "fate of the gods" - Ragnarök. She describes the summons to battle, the deaths of many of the gods and how Odin, himself, is slain by Fenrir, the great wolf. Thor, the god of thunder and sworn protector of the earth, faces Jörmungandr, the world serpent, and wins but Thor is only able to take nine steps afterward before collapsing due to the serpent's venom. Víðarr faces Fenrir and kicks his jaw open before stabbing the wolf in the heart with his spear. The god Freyr fights the giant Surtr, who wields a fiery sword that shines brighter than the sun, and Freyr falls. 

Finally a beautiful reborn world will rise from the ashes of death and destruction where Baldr and Höðr will live again in a new world where the earth sprouts abundance without sowing seed. The surviving Æsir reunite with Hœnir and meet together at the field of Iðavöllr, discussing Jörmungandr, great events of the past, and the runic alphabet. A final stanza describes the sudden appearance of Nidhogg the dragon, bearing corpses in his wings, before the seeress emerges from her trance.

Reception
Völuspá is still one of the most discussed poems of the Poetic Edda and dates to the 10th century, the century before the Christianization of Iceland.

Some scholars hold that there are Christian influences in the text, emphasizing parallels with the Sibylline Prophecies. Henry Adams Bellows stated in 1936 that the author of Völuspá would have had knowledge of Christianity and infused it into the poem. Bellows dates the poem to the 10th century which was a transitional period between paganism and Christianity and both religions would have co-existed before Christianity was declared the official religion of Iceland and the old paganism was tolerated if practiced in private. This allowed the traditions to survive to an extent in Iceland unlike in mainland Scandinavia.

In March 2018, a team of medieval historians and scientists from the University of Cambridge suggested that the Icelandic poem, Vǫluspá, estimated to date from 961, was a roughly contemporary chronicle of the volcano Eldgjá's eruption in 939. [5] The researchers suggested that the dramatic imagery of Eldgjá's eruption was purposefully invoked in order to accelerate the Christianization of Iceland.

Some have suggested that the Dvergatal section and the part where the "mighty one who rules over all" are later insertions to the poem. Although some have identified the latter figure with Jesus, Bellows thought this was not necessarily the case.

In popular culture

J. R. R. Tolkien, a philologist familiar with the Völuspá, utilized names from the Dvergatal for the Dwarves and for the Wizard Gandalf in his 1937 fantasy novel The Hobbit.
Stanzas from Völuspa are performed in songform in the TV series Vikings and used as battle chants.
The 2012 atmospheric black metal album Umskiptar by Burzum takes lyrics from Völuspá.
Various stanzas from Völuspa are utilised in the song “Twilight of the Gods” in the 2020 video game ‘’Assassin’s Creed Valhalla’’.

References

Relevant literature
 Bugge, Sophus (1867). Norræn fornkvæði. Christiania: Malling. Available online
 Dronke, Ursula (1997). The Poetic Edda Volume II Mythological Poems. Oxford: Clarendon Press.
 Eysteinn Björnsson (ed.). Völuspá. Available online
Gunnell, Terry  and Annette Lassen, eds. 2013. The Nordic Apocalypse: Approaches to Völuspa and Nordic Days of Judgement. Brepols Publishers. 240 pages.  
 McKinnell, John (2008). "Völuspá and the Feast of Easter," Alvíssmál 12:3–28. (pdf) 
 Sigurður Nordal (1952). Völuspá. Reykjavík: Helgafell.
 Ólason, Vésteinn. "Vǫluspá and time." In The Nordic Apocalypse: Approaches to Vǫluspá and Nordic Days of Judgement, pp. 25–44. 2013.
 Thorpe, Benjamin (tr.) (1866). Edda Sæmundar Hinns Froða: The Edda Of Sæmund The Learned. (2 vols.) London: Trübner & Co. Norroena Society edition available online at Google Books

External links

MyNDIR (My Norse Digital Image repository) illustrations from Victorian and Edwardian  retellings of Völuspá. Clicking on the thumbnail will give you the full image and information concerning it.

English translations
Voluspo Translation and commentary by Henry Adams Bellows
Völuspâ Translation by Benjamin Thorpe

Old Norse editions
Völuspá Sophus Bugge's edition and commentary with manuscript texts
Völuspá Eysteinn Björnsson's edition with manuscript texts
Völuspá Guðni Jónsson's edition

13th-century poems
Eschatology in Norse mythology
Eddic poetry
Old Norse philosophy
Sources of Norse mythology
Creation myths
Ymir